Donald K. Walker (born January 4, 1980) is a former professional American mixed martial artist. A professional from 2004 until 2013, he competed for the UFC, Bellator, and King of the Cage.

Mixed martial arts career
Walker began his MMA career competing mostly in regional promotions across the midwest with most of his bouts occurring in the featherweight division against notable opponents Jeff Curran and Cub Swanson.  Walker was the reigning NAAFS Featherweight Champion before signing with the UFC.

Ultimate Fighting Championship
Walker tried out for the fourteenth season of The Ultimate Fighter, making it to the interview round, but was not selected.

Instead, Walker dropped to the bantamweight division and signed with the UFC.  He made his promotional debut against fellow newcomer Jeff Hougland on July 2, 2011 at UFC 132.  He lost the fight via unanimous decision.

Walker faced Ken Stone on September 17, 2011 at UFC Fight Night 25.  He was submitted via rear naked choke at 2:40 seconds of the first round.
 
After going 0–2 in the UFC, he was subsequently released from the promotion.

Championships and accomplishments
North American Allied Fight Series
NAAFS Featherweight Championship (One time)

Mixed martial arts record

|-
| Loss
| align=center| 15–10
| Mark Cherico
| TKO (punches) 
| Pinnacle FC: Pittsburgh Challenge Series 3
| 
| align=center| 2
| align=center| 1:04
| Canonsburg, Pennsylvania, United States
| 
|-
| Loss
| align=center| 15–9
| Frank Caraballo
| KO (flying knee) 
| Bellator 66
| 
| align=center| 4
| align=center| 2:25
| Cleveland, Ohio, United States
| Return to Featherweight; lost NAAFS Featherweight Championship.
|-
| Loss
| align=center| 15–8
| Ken Stone
| Technical Submission (rear-naked choke) 
| UFC Fight Night: Shields vs. Ellenberger
| 
| align=center| 1
| align=center| 2:40
| New Orleans, Louisiana, United States
| 
|-
| Loss
| align=center| 15–7
| Jeff Hougland
| Decision (unanimous) 
| UFC 132
| 
| align=center| 3
| align=center| 5:00
| Las Vegas, Nevada, United States
| 
|-
| Win
| align=center| 15–6
| Billy Vaughan
| Submission (rear-naked choke)
| NAAFS: Night of Champions 2010
| 
| align=center| 1
| align=center| 2:58
| Cleveland, Ohio, United States
| Defended NAAFS Featherweight Championship.
|-
| Win
| align=center| 14–6
| Mike Nesto
| Decision (unanimous)
| NAAFS: Rock N Rumble 4
| 
| align=center| 5
| align=center| 5:00
| Cleveland, Ohio, United States
| Won NAAFS Featherweight Championship.
|-
| Win
| align=center| 13–6
| Kenny Foster
| TKO (punches)
| EFC: Downtown Beatdown 3
| 
| align=center| 3
| align=center| 0:52
| Erie, Pennsylvania, United States
| 
|-
| Win
| align=center| 12–6
| Dustin Kempf
| TKO (punches)
| NAAFS: Caged Fury 9
| 
| align=center| 2
| align=center| 4:55
| Cleveland, Ohio, United States
| 
|-
| Win
| align=center| 11–6
| Tony Jayme
| Decision (split)
| NAAFS: Caged Vengeance 6
| 
| align=center| 3
| align=center| 5:00
| Columbus, Ohio, United States
| 
|-
| Win
| align=center| 10–6
| Bruce Ferguson
| Submission (armbar)
| UMMAXX 8: All Heart, No Fear
| 
| align=center| 3
| align=center| 2:04
| Akron, Ohio, United States
| 
|-
| Win
| align=center| 9–6
| Brad Fonck
| TKO (punches)
| UMMAXX 7: Out of the Cage
| 
| align=center| 1
| align=center| 0:32
| Akron, Ohio, United States
| 
|-
| Loss
| align=center| 8–6
| Cody Stevens
| Submission (rear-naked choke)
| NAAFS: Rock N Rumble 2
| 
| align=center| 5
| align=center| 4:14
| Cleveland, Ohio, United States
| 
|-
| Loss
| align=center| 8–5
| Cub Swanson
| Submission (rear-naked choke)
| IFBL: Fight Night 11
| 
| align=center| 3
| align=center| 1:24
| Niles, Ohio, United States
| 
|-
| Win
| align=center| 8–4
| Sonny Marchette
| Submission (triangle choke)
| NAAFS: Caged Fury 3
| 
| align=center| 2
| align=center| 2:16
| Cleveland, Ohio, United States
| 
|-
| Loss
| align=center| 7–4
| Yaotzin Meza
| TKO (punches)
| EC: Fights
| 
| align=center| 2
| align=center| N/A
| Monterrey, Mexico
| 
|-
| Win
| align=center| 7–3
| Ryan McIntosh
| Submission (guillotine choke)
| Superior Fight Night 3
| 
| align=center| 1
| align=center| 0:24
| Cleveland, Ohio, United States
| 
|-
| Loss
| align=center| 6–3
| Mike Bogner
| Decision (unanimous)
| NAAFS: Caged Fury 2
| 
| align=center| 3
| align=center| 5:00
| Cleveland, Ohio, United States
| 
|-
| Loss
| align=center| 6–2
| Jeff Curran
| Submission (rear-naked choke)
| KOTC: Hard Knocks
| 
| align=center| 3
| align=center| 3:23
| Rockford, Illinois, United States
| 
|-
| Win
| align=center| 6–1
| Dan Swift
| Decision (split)
| NAAFS: Caged Vengeance 2
| 
| align=center| 3
| align=center| 5:00
| Cleveland, Ohio, United States
| 
|-
| Win
| align=center| 5–1
| Jason Taylor
| Submission (triangle choke)
| NAAFS: Fight Night in the Flats 2
| 
| align=center| 2
| align=center| 2:33
| Cleveland, Ohio, United States
| 
|-
| Win
| align=center| 4–1
| Jesse Lessard
| Submission (armbar)
| KOTC: Shock and Awe
| 
| align=center| 1
| align=center| 2:32
| Edmonton, Alberta, Canada
| 
|-
| Win
| align=center| 3–1
| Adam Bass
| TKO (punches)
| ECC: Ho Ho Ho KO
| 
| align=center| 1
| align=center| N/A
| Dayton, Ohio, United States
| 
|-
| Loss
| align=center| 2–1
| Josh Souder
| Submission (heel hook)
| KOTC 42: Buckeye Nuts
| 
| align=center| 2
| align=center| N/A
| Dayton, Ohio, United States
| 
|-
| Win
| align=center| 2–0
| Jim Calazante
| Submission (rear-naked choke)
| Xtreme Fighting Organization 3
| 
| align=center| 2
| align=center| 1:20
| Lakemoor, Illinois, United States
| 
|-
| Win
| align=center| 1–0
| Jason Cable
| Submission (armbar)
| Extreme Fighting Challenge 9
| 
| align=center| 1
| align=center| 2:55
| Cleveland, Ohio, United States
|

References

External links
Official UFC Profile

Donny Walker Official web site - https://web.archive.org/web/20110207190146/http://donny-walker.com/

American male mixed martial artists
Mixed martial artists utilizing Muay Thai
American Muay Thai practitioners
Living people
1980 births
Mixed martial artists from Ohio
Sportspeople from Cleveland
People from Madison, Ohio
Ultimate Fighting Championship male fighters